The Tudor Crown, also known as the Imperial Crown, is a widely used symbol in heraldry of the United Kingdom. In use officially from 1902 to 1953 and again from 2022, it represents both the British monarch personally and  "the Crown", meaning the sovereign source of governmental authority. As such, it appears on numerous official emblems in the United Kingdom, British Empire and Commonwealth.

History

The heraldic depictions of the royal crown have undergone many changes in their form and enrichment. The crown began to assume its present form in the reign of Henry V. Henry V's crown consisted of a jewelled circlet heightened by four crosses pattée alternating with eight fleurs-de-lis in pairs, and two arches springing from behind the crosses and supporting at the top a mound and cross (similar to an orb). In some reigns additional arches were used, and the number of crosses pattée and fleurs-de-lis was varied. By the reign of Charles I the royal crown was depicted similarly to the Tudor crown (made either for Henry VII or Henry VIII) which had four crosses pattée alternating with four fleurs-de-lis, and also four arches rising almost to a point, the arches being studded with pearls. This crown was destroyed during the Protectorate.

After the restoration of the monarchy, Charles II based the royal crown on the new St Edward's Crown, which had four crosses pattée alternating with four fleurs-de-lis, the number of arches was reduced to two and the curvature of the arches being  depressed at the point of intersection. On this pattern the royal crown was depicted until the reign of Queen Victoria.

While various crown symbols had been used for this purpose for many years previously, in 1880 after Queen Victoria became Empress of India it was felt that the heraldic crown should be given an imperial form, and this was effected by making the arches semi-circular joined at the top with the mound and cross. The new design was never intended to represent any actual physical crown and its depiction was never officially standardised at the time, although in shape it bears a close resemblance to both the Imperial State Crown and the small diamond crown of Queen Victoria. As a result of this change the depiction of the crown was very much "at the mercy" of the artist and many variants emerged. After the accession of Edward VII the War Office raised the issue of a standardised design for use by the army. The king decided on the 'Tudor' or 'imperial' crown design, and henceforth only this depiction of the crown was used.

In 1952 Queen Elizabeth II requested the design be replaced with a representation of the St Edward's Crown which she wore at her coronation. Many, though not all, of the derived designs around the world were updated to match.

In Canada, the Tudor Crown has been used since 1907 in the Canadian Government Inspection Legend on inspected meat products. The inspection legend (or symbol) consists of two concentric circles: the outer ring has the word "Canada" at the top and a number at the bottom identifying the place of production; the inner circle contains a black and white rendering of the Tudor Crown.

Following the death of Elizabeth II, the design of King Charles III's royal cypher was announced on 27 September 2022, which featured the Tudor crown rather than the St Edward’s Crown. According to the College of Arms, it is envisaged that this depiction will now be used in representations of the Royal Arms, badges and military uniforms.

Gallery

Coats of arms

Cyphers

Flags

Others

See also
 Gallery of British crowns and coronets

References

External links

 

Crowns in heraldry
Canadian heraldry
National symbols of the United Kingdom
Provincial symbols of Quebec
Symbols introduced in 1902